The 2016 Arizona Wildcats baseball team represented the University of Arizona in the 2016 NCAA Division I baseball season.  The Wildcats played their home games at Hi Corbett Field, off campus in Tucson, Arizona.  Jay Johnson was in his first season as Arizona Wildcats baseball head coach. Johnson was in his fourth year as a head coach.

Personnel

Roster

Coaches

Opening day

Schedule and results

Lafayette Regional

Starkville Super Regional

College World Series

Rankings

2016 MLB draft

References

Arizona Wildcats baseball seasons
Arizona Wildcats
Arizona
College World Series seasons
Arizona Wildcats